IMDG Code or International Maritime Dangerous Goods Code is accepted by MSC (Maritime Safety Committee) as an international guideline to the safe transportation or shipment of dangerous goods or hazardous materials by water on vessel. IMDG Code is intended to protect crew members and to prevent marine pollution in the safe transportation of hazardous materials by vessel.

Basis for national regulations
It is recommended to governments for adoption or for use as the basis for national regulations and is mandatory in conjunction with the obligations of the members of United Nations under the International Convention for the Safety of Life at Sea (SOLAS) and the International Convention for the Prevention of Pollution from Ships (MARPOL 73/78).
It is intended for use not only by the mariner but also by all those involved in industries and services connected with shipping. Contains advice on terminology, packaging, labeling, placarding, markings, stowage, segregation, handling, and emergency response.  The HNS Convention covers hazardous and noxious substances that are included in the IMDG code.

Updates
The code is updated and maintained by the CCC (formerly DSC) Sub-Committee of the International Maritime Organization every 2 years.

Code in 2021
IMDG Code in calendar year 2021 is either the 2018 Edition; Incorporating Amendment 39-18 or 2020 Edition; Incorporating Amendment 40-20.  Both the 2018 Edition and the 2020 Edition can be used in 2021.

References

External links
IMO Website: IMDG Code
US Office of Hazardous Materials Safety
IMO:Carriage of chemicals by ship 
IMO:Preamble:IMDG Code 2006 Edition 
IMDG CODE in French version
The codes as an Open Knowledge foundation dataset
Free IMDG Code resources including free introduction and summary of recent changes

Water transport
Chemical safety
International Maritime Organization
Law of the sea